Rodica Avasiloaie is a librarian from Moldova. She is the Deputy Director of the National Library of Moldova.

Awards
 Order of the Star of Romania for outstanding achievements in spreading the Romanian culture, 2000
 Special prize for bibliographic work

See also
 National Library of Moldova

References

Moldovan writers
Moldovan activists
Moldovan librarians
Women librarians
Moldovan women
Living people
Year of birth missing (living people)